The seal of the president of the Philippines is a symbol used to represent the history and dignity of the president of the Philippines. Its original form was designed by Captain Galo B. Ocampo, secretary of the Philippine Heraldry Committee, and patterned after the seal of the president of the United States. It was first used by President Manuel Roxas in 1947.

Description and Symbolism
The seal is composed of the coat of arms of the president, which, according to Executive Order No. 310 of 2004 consists of:

Regarding the design of the seal, the executive order states the following:

Some of the symbols in the arms are derived from the National Flag, and retain their meaning. The eight-rayed sun represent the eight provinces placed under martial law in 1896 at the onset of the Philippine Revolution. On the sun there is an equilateral triangle (colored red as opposed to the Flag's white), representing liberty, equality, and fraternity, which were ideals of the Revolution. The stars at the corners of the triangle represent the three major island groups of Luzon, Visayas and Mindanao.

At the center of the coat of arms is a sea-lion, which is derived from the coat of arms of the city of Manila granted by King Philip II of Spain in 1596. It has the upper half of a lion, and the lower half and curled tail of a fish. The sea-lion as a heraldic device ultimately comes from the lion on the coat of arms of Castile and León; since the islands were an overseas (ultramar) possession, the lion became a sea lion.

History
The seal was first used by President Manuel Roxas in 1947. It was designed by Captain Galo B. Ocampo of the Philippine Heraldry Committee, who also designed the coat of arms of the Philippines. The seal was officially prescribed on January 7, 1947, when Executive Order No. 38 of 1947 was signed. It prescribed the coat of arms and seal of the president as:

On July 4, 1951, President Elpidio Quirino, signed Executive Order No. 457 into law prescribing that:

At the time of signing, the Philippines had 52 provinces.

On August 27, 1998, President Joseph Estrada signed Executive Order No. 19, amending Executive Order No. 38 of 1947 (as amended) in view of the fact that 1951, the number of provinces has increased to 78 and that there is a need to synchronize the number of stars to match the number of provinces at a given time.

After Estrada's executive order came into effect, Roxas's executive order read:

On April 20, 2004, President Gloria Macapagal Arroyo signed Executive Order No. 310, which standardized the seal and its derivative material. The seal as it appears on government documents and property has since been redesigned to conform with the executive order.

Historical seals

See also

President of the Philippines
Seal of the Vice President of the Philippines
Coat of arms of the Philippines
Flag of the President of the Philippines
Flag of the Philippines

References

 Executive Order No. 38, s. 1947 Official Gazette
 Executive Order No. 457, s. 1951 Official Gazette
 Executive Order No. 19, s. 1998 Official Gazette
 Executive Order No. 310, s. 2004 Official Gazette
 The Presidential Seal
 Philippines: President and Vice President
 A presentation box with the Presidential Seal, circa 1969:  "This seal predates the (1981) change in the presidential seal ordered by Ferdinand Marcos during his tenure as president."

 Seal
National symbols of the Philippines
Philippines